Livanates is a seaside town (population in 2011: 2,559) in Phthiotis, central Greece. It is located 68 km southeast of Lamia and it was the seat of the municipality of Dafnousia between 1997 and 2011.

History
Kynos, an ancient settlement site, can be found at the edge of the town.  The medieval settlement was established by Arvanites. Livanates has been attested since 1540 as an Arvanite settlement. The Arvanitic dialect spoken in Livanates has some unique features that differentiate it from the other Arvanitic dialects.

Livanates had 1,021 people in the 1890s. In April 1894, a strong earthquake ravaged the town, killed 5 residents and injured 20 more.

During the occupation in World War II, Canada saved many Athenians from starvation by donating wheat, potatoes, chick peas and cottons, as well as vegetables.  During that period, Kynos hill was used for its military base as a camp and a prison.

Economy
The region produces meat, fish, potatoes, tomatoes, olives and olive oil, tobacco and cotton.

Landmarks
Notable sites are the Church of Agioi Theodoroi, a small Byzantine church which is an alleged site of krifo scholio, and the Monastery of the Transfiguration.

Livanates has three beaches, 'Kyani Akti' (Blue Coast),'Skinia' and 'Ai-Giannis'.  Kyani Akti is the main beach and is located 1-1.5 km from the main square.

Other

The Livanates Odysseas Androutsos Cultural Council was formed in 1979 and is named after the famous hero of the Greek Revolution of 1821.  Livanates also has a women's council known as I Pyrrha and a football (soccer) club known as Dafni (prefectural (subregional) winner in 2002 and 2005 and cup winner in 2004).

Sources

Further reading
Dimitrios P. Avraam Lokrika, Lamia, 2001
Balta, Evangelia The Region of Atalanti and Moudounitza in the Ottoman Period (15th-16th Century), from ax Ottomana. Studies in Memoriam Prof. Dr. Nejat Göyünç, (ed.) Kemal Cicewk, Haarlem-Ankara 2001, Sota-Yeni Türkiye, 151-182
Biris, Kostas I. Arvanites - The gift of Modern Greek: History of Greek Arvanites (Αρβανίτες - Οι δωριείς του νεώτερου ελληνισμού: Ιστορία των Ελλήνων Αρβανιτών) Melissa 1998
Christoforou, Manthos L. I Opoundia Lokrida kai i Atalanti - Mnimes kai martyries (Opuntian Locris and Atalanta/Atalanti, Monuments and Memorials, Parts 1 (1991) and 2 (1993), Athens, Atalanti Historic and Folkloric Information Company (EILEA).
Christoforou, Manthos L. Opoudos (Opus) and Atalandi (Atalanta), Timeline of 4000 Years (Χρονολόγιο Οπούντος και Αταλάντης 4000 χρόνια – εν τάχει) - Municipality of Atalanti Publishers
Karastathis, Konstantinos Malesina, History, Memorials and Ancient Villages (Μαλεσίνα: Ιστορία, Μνημεία, Αρχαιολογικοί χώροι) 1999
Locrian Chronicles (Λοκρικά Χρονικά) Athens 1997, Atalanti Historic and Folkloric Information Company (EILEA), 3rd Edition
Mitsopoulos, K. 1895 The Great Locrian Earthquake in April 1894 (Ο μέγας της Λοκρίδος σεισμός – κατά τον Απρίλιο του 1894) National Press, Athens 1895
Protopappas, Zisis (1952) Lokrida (Λοκρίδα), Athens

External links
Website with information about Livanates 
Municipal unit of Dafnoussia 
Municipal unit of Dafnoussia 

Populated places in Phthiotis
Arvanite settlements